Cobetia marina is a Gram-negative halophilic marine bacterium.

History
In 2013, Halomonas halodurans was found to be a later description of the same bacteria, and was therefore reclassified as Cobetia marina.

References

External links
Type strain of Cobetia marina at BacDive -  the Bacterial Diversity Metadatabase

Oceanospirillales
Bacteria described in 2002